Adel Jadoua (born 13 September 1981) is a retired Qatari footballer. He previously played for Austrian club Rapid Vienna in 2002.

References

External links
 

Qatari footballers
1981 births
Living people
Qatari expatriate footballers
Al-Gharafa SC players
Qatar SC players
Al Sadd SC players
SK Rapid Wien players
Expatriate footballers in Austria
Qatari expatriate sportspeople in Austria
Association football midfielders
Qatar international footballers